Pseudomaribius is a Gram-negative and non-motile genus of bacteria from the family of Rhodobacteraceae with one known species (Pseudomaribius aestuariivivens). Pseudomaribius aestuariivivens has been isolated from tidal flat sediments from the Yellow Sea in Korea.

References

Rhodobacteraceae
Bacteria genera
Monotypic bacteria genera